Bihar National College is a constituent unit of Patna University. It is a multi-faculty college and offers courses in Science, Humanities, and Arts at graduate level. It is a post-graduate college but post-graduate teaching has been stopped for many years due to an insufficient number of teachers. At present there are 42 faculty members.

History 
Bihar National College came into being with its status raised to second grade college in year 1889 by the government canto and tobakachi. It was founded as a high school by Babu Bisheshwar Singh in 1883. Later it was raised to the status of B.A. degree level in 1907 imparting degrees both in arts and science.

Campus 
The college is situated in central Patna close to Gandhi Maidan with the river Ganges flowing south of it. A hostel facility is also available. There is a lush green campus with playground.

References 

Colleges affiliated to Patna University
Universities and colleges in Patna
Educational institutions established in 1889
1889 establishments in India
Bihar National College